Moissy may refer to:

The name or part of the name of two communes of France:
Moissy-Cramayel in the Seine-et-Marne département
Moissy-Moulinot in the Nièvre département
Moissy, a young revolutionary militia created by Comorian president Ali Soilih (1975-1978)